David Arthur Gillespie (born 20 December 1957) is an Australian politician and gastroenterologist. He is a member of the National Party and has served in the House of Representatives since 2013, representing the New South Wales seat of Lyne. He held ministerial portfolios during the Turnbull and Morrison governments as Assistant Minister for Rural Health (2016–2017), Assistant Minister for Health (2017), Assistant Minister for Children and Families (2017–2018), Minister for Regional Health (2021–2022), and Minister Assisting the Minister for Trade and Investment (2021–2022).

Early life
Gillespie was born in Canberra and educated at Saint Ignatius' College, Riverview. He was a gastroenterologist for twenty years and, up until the 2013 election, was the director of physician training at Port Macquarie Base Hospital.

Politics
Gillespie contested the seat of Lyne for the first time in 2010. While he lost to the incumbent, National-turned-independent Rob Oakeshott, the Nationals picked up an 11-point swing. Following Oakeshott's retirement at the 2013 federal election, Gillespie contested the seat again and won it resoundingly. During Oakeshott's tenure, Lyne remained a comfortably safe National seat in a traditional two-party matchup with Labor, so it had been expected that the seat would revert to the Nationals once Oakeshott retired.

Turnbull Government
After the re-election of the Turnbull Government at the 2016 federal election, Gillespie was appointed Assistant Minister for Rural Health in the a ministerial reshuffle. He was promoted to Assistant Minister for Health in a subsequent rearrangement of the ministry in January 2017. He was instead made  Assistant Minister for Children and Families in December 2017.

Gillespie has argued for politicians who represent electorates larger than 10,000 square kilometres (such as his own) to receive additional expenses.

In February 2018, Gillespie was briefly a candidate to replace Barnaby Joyce as National Party leader. After finding a lack of support for his candidacy within the party room, he withdrew from the race and endorsed Michael McCormack, the only other announced candidate.

Gillespie was not retained in the ministry when Scott Morrison replaced Turnbull as prime minister in August 2018. He said he was "disappointed but it is a very competitive space, and the reshuffle is a reflection of how much talent we have". He also stated that "the general electorate was pretty disgusted with all the factional wars that we saw played out in public".

Morrison Government
Following the resignation of Bridget McKenzie, Gillespie stood unsuccessfully for the deputy leadership of the National Party in February 2020. He was defeated by David Littleproud, with Keith Pitt also running. In the lead-up to the vote, he criticised party leader Michael McCormack's lack of engagement with the national media. McCormack defeated Barnaby Joyce in a leadership ballot, and Gillespie subsequently stated that "the leader has our full support" and that another challenge to McCormack's leadership was unlikely. In 2021, Barnaby Joyce successfully challenged McCormack for the leadership of the National Party.

In the cabinet reshuffle in late June 2021, he was appointed as the Minister for Regional Health. He held the position until the Coalition's defeat at the 2022 federal election.

Parliamentary eligibility

Gillespie came under scrutiny after the High Court ruling in the Bob Day case. In April 2017, the High Court found that, under section 44(v) of the Australian Constitution, Senator Bob Day had not been eligible to hold public office because of an indirect pecuniary relationship with the Australian government. The Australian Labor Party (ALP) opposition and some community groups believe that Gillespie also has an indirect financial relationship with the federal government, in that he owns a suburban shopping complex in Port Macquarie which leases a premises to an Australia Post licensee. In July 2017, the ALP launched a High Court challenge to Gillespie's eligibility as an MP. The case was formally brought by Peter Alley, the ALP candidate for Gillespie's seat of Lyne at the 2016 federal election. Gillespie sold his interest in the shopping complex in early 2018, which would ensure his eligibility in a by-election if the court ruled that he was ineligible at the time of the 2016 election. On 21 March 2018 the seven members of the High Court determined unanimously that it does not have the jurisdiction to hear the case, unless this matter is referred to it by parliament.

Personal
Gillespie is married to Charlotte, and they have three children. The family lives at Sancrox, west of Port Macquarie. He is a Roman Catholic.

References

External links
 
 

|-

1957 births
Australian gastroenterologists
Government ministers of Australia
Living people
Members of the Australian House of Representatives
Members of the Australian House of Representatives for Lyne
National Party of Australia members of the Parliament of Australia
Sydney Medical School alumni
21st-century Australian politicians
Turnbull Government